ŽNK Donat is a Croatian women's association football club based in Zadar. The club was founded in 2014 and it currently competes in the Croatian First Division.

Recent seasons

References

Women's football clubs in Croatia
Association football clubs established in 2014
2014 establishments in Croatia
Sport in Zadar